Oarotrechus gracilentus is a species of beetle in the family Carabidae, the only species in the genus Oarotrechus.

References

Trechinae